Tjörven De Brul (born 22 June 1973) is a retired Belgian football defender and current head coach of SK Berlare.

Career

Coaching career
After retiring in the summer 2011, De Brul was hired as head coach of Belgian fourth division club K.R.C. Gent in October 2011. He was fired on 27 December 2012 due to poor results. In April 2013, he was appointed head coach of KVC Jong Lede. He left the club at the end of the 2013-14 season.

At the end of December 2019, he was appointed head coach of his former club, SK Berlare.

Honours
Club Brugge
Belgian Cup: 1994–95, 1995–96
Belgian First Division: 1995–96, 1997–98, 2002–03
Belgian Super Cup: 1998

Zulte Waregem
Belgian Cup: 2005–06

References

External links

1973 births
Living people
Belgian footballers
Belgian football managers
Belgian Pro League players
K.S.C. Lokeren Oost-Vlaanderen players
Club Brugge KV players
K.A.A. Gent players
S.V. Zulte Waregem players
K.S.K. Ronse players
Association football defenders
Belgium under-21 international footballers
Belgium international footballers
K.R.C. Gent managers